The 2014 Canoe Slalom World Cup was a series of five races in 5 canoeing and kayaking categories organized by the International Canoe Federation (ICF). It was the 27th edition.

Calendar 

The series opened with World Cup Race 1 in Lee Valley, England (June 6–8) and ended with the World Cup Final in Augsburg, Germany (August 15–17).

Final standings 

The winner of each race was awarded 60 points (double points were awarded for the World Cup Final). Points for lower places differed from one category to another. Every participant was guaranteed at least 2 points for participation and 5 points for qualifying for the semifinal run (4 and 10 points in the World Cup Final respectively). If two or more athletes or boats were equal on points, the ranking was determined by their positions in the World Cup Final.

Results

World Cup Race 1 

The first race of the season took place at the Lee Valley White Water Centre, England from 6 to 8 June.

World Cup Race 2 

The second race of the season took place at the Tacen Whitewater Course, Slovenia from 13 to 15 June.

World Cup Race 3 

The third race of the season took place at the Prague-Troja Canoeing Centre, Czech Republic from 20 to 22 June.

World Cup Race 4 

The penultimate race of the series took place at the Segre Olympic Park in La Seu d'Urgell, Spain from 1 to 3 August. There were no team events held here.

World Cup Final 

The final race of the series took place at the Augsburg Eiskanal, Germany from 15 to 17 August.

References

External links 
 International Canoe Federation

Canoe Slalom World Cup
Canoe Slalom World Cup